The White Hell is a 1954 Turkish crime adventure film directed by Metin Erksan, based on the novel by Peyami Safa. It stars Turan Seyfioglu, Avni Dilligil, and Neriman Köksal.

References

External links
 
 

1954 films
Turkish crime films
1950s crime films
Films directed by Metin Erksan
Films based on Turkish novels
Turkish black-and-white films